Steele Lake is a freshwater lake located in Douglas County, Wisconsin. It has a surface area of 152 acres, and is used for fishing. One can catch fish such as bluegill, northern pike and panfish. The bottom of the lake is mostly sand and muck, resulting in a trophic status assessed as eutrophic.

References 

Lakes of Douglas County, Wisconsin
Lakes of Wisconsin